Wortel is a Dutch word meaning carrot. As a name, it may refer to:

People
 Ans Wortel (1929–1996), Dutch painter, poet and writer
 Meike Wortel (born 1982), Dutch bridge player
 Willy Wortel, stage name of Willem Klein, Dutch mathematician

Places
 Wortel, Belgium, village in the Belgian municipality of Hoogstraten